Ricky "Rick" Allen Dearborn (born July 19, 1965) is an American government official and lobbyist who served as the White House Deputy Chief of Staff for Legislative, Intergovernmental Affairs and Implementation in the administration of U.S. President Donald Trump for less than a year from 2017 to 2018. Prior to this role, he was the executive director of Donald Trump's presidential transition team and served in various positions on the U.S. Senate staff.

Career

Dearborn worked for six U.S. Senators, including two members of Senate leadership, and spent more than 25 years working on Capitol Hill. He was nominated by President George W. Bush and confirmed by the Senate to become the Assistant Secretary for Congressional Affairs at the United States Department of Energy, where he worked with the Senate, House, and Tribal Governments on achieving President George W. Bush's Energy Agenda. After leaving the Department of Energy in 2004, Dearborn worked as the Chief of Staff for Senator Jeff Sessions from 2005 to 2017. He succeeded Armand DeKeyser.

Dearborn was one of two former senior Sessions staffers appointed to senior roles in the Trump White House, the other being White House Senior Advisor Stephen Miller.

Trump administration

Presidential transition team
Dearborn was a member of Donald Trump's presidential transition team. The transition team was a group of around 100 aides, policy experts, government affairs officials, and former government officials who were tasked with vetting, interviewing, and recommending individuals for top cabinet and staff roles in Trump's administration. Vice President Mike Pence was named Chairman of transition after Chairman Chris Christie was fired, with Dearborn as staff director.

Dearborn, alongside Marc Short, and Andrew Bremberg, coordinated with aides of Senator Mitch McConnell in employing the Congressional Review Act to reverse 13 regulations made late in the presidency of Barack Obama by creating an Excel spreadsheet of targets, eventually being able to eliminate over twice as many regulations as they had anticipated.

White House staff ouster after less than a year
Dearborn took a relatively low-key approach while serving in the White House.

On November 10, 2017, Politico reported, that "Deputy chief of staff Rick Dearborn's departure would make him the latest in a growing conga line of West Wing aides who started on Inauguration Day but failed to last a full year."

On December 21, 2017, the White House announced that Dearborn would resign in early 2018.

Post-White House career
Dearborn joined a consulting firm after leaving the White House.

See also
Timeline of investigations into Trump and Russia (2019)

References

1965 births
George W. Bush administration personnel
Living people
Trump administration personnel
United States Department of Energy officials
University of Oklahoma alumni
White House Deputy Chiefs of Staff